is a private women's junior college in Hidaka, Saitama, Japan, established in 1989.

External links
  

Japanese junior colleges
Educational institutions established in 1989
Private universities and colleges in Japan
Universities and colleges in Saitama Prefecture
Hidaka, Saitama
1989 establishments in Japan